Winder (pronounced WINE-der) is a city and the county seat of Barrow County, Georgia, United States. It is located east of Atlanta and is part of the Atlanta metropolitan area. The population was 18,338 at the 2020 census.

History
The Georgia General Assembly incorporated Winder in 1893. The community was named after John H. Winder, a railroad builder, and not the John H. Winder who served as a General in the Confederate Army. Before Winder was named Winder it was originally named Jug Tavern.

The first hotel of the Jameson Inn chain opened in Winder in 1987.

The first Doctors’ Day observance was March 28, 1933, in Winder. This first observance included the mailing of cards to the physicians and their wives, flowers placed on graves of deceased doctors, including Dr. Long, and a formal dinner in the home of Dr. and Mrs. William T. Randolph. After the Barrow County Alliance adopted Mrs. Almond's resolution to pay tribute to the doctors, the plan was presented to the Georgia State Medical Alliance in 1933 by Mrs. E. R. Harris of Winder, president of the Barrow County Alliance. On May 10, 1934, the resolution was adopted at the annual state meeting in Augusta, Georgia. The resolution was introduced to the Women's Alliance of the Southern Medical Association at its 29th annual meeting held in St. Louis, Missouri, November 19–22, 1935, by the Alliance president, Mrs. J. Bonar White. Since then, Doctors' Day has become an integral part of and synonymous with, the Southern Medical Association Alliance.

Geography
Winder is located in central Barrow County at  (33.996495, -83.720873).

Transportation

Major roads

  State Route 8
  State Route 11
  U.S. Route 29
  State Route 53
  State Route 81
  State Route 82
  State Route 211

Pedestrians and cycling
There are limited walkability options available currently. However, neighboring Clarke, Gwinnett and Hall counties have accessible trails available.

Demographics

2020 census

As of the 2020 United States census, there were 18,338 people, 5,799 households, and 3,885 families residing in the city.

2010 census
As of the census of 2010, there were  14,391 people, 4,693 households, and  3,599 families residing in the city. The racial makeup of the city was 71.8% White, 18.2% African American, 0.25% Native American, 2.0% Asian, 0.1% Pacific Islander, 1.72% from other races, and 2.8% from two or more races. Hispanic or Latino of any race were 9.8% of the population.

There were 4,693 households, out of which 34.2% had children under the age of 18 living with them, 45.7% were married couples living together, 17.5% had a female householder with no husband present, and 32.1% were non-families. 27.3% of all households were made up of individuals, and 12.2% had someone living alone who was 65 years of age or older.  The average household size was 2.53 and the average family size was 3.07.

In the city, the population was spread out, with 26.3% under the age of 18, 9.5% from 18 to 24, 30.9% from 25 to 44, 19.1% from 45 to 64, and 14.2% who were 65 years of age or older.  The median age was 34 years. For every 100 females, there were 90.1 males.  For every 100 females age 18 and over, there were 83.9 males.

The median income for a household in the city was $35,924, and the median income for a family was $40,896. Males had a median income of $31,371 versus $21,736 for females. The per capita income for the city was $17,108.  About 10.3% of families and 13.1% of the population were below the poverty line, including 14.3% of those under age 18 and 16.8% of those age 65 or over.

It has a variety of retail establishments and restaurants, especially in a new trade area that was  recently annexed into the City known as The Gateway.  "The Gateway" at University Parkway is a 130-acre retail development that's home of AMC (Previously Carmike) Gateway Cinemas and multiple restaurants and retail establishments.  University Parkway. In November 2011, Winder residents approved Sunday alcohol sales, becoming one of the first cities in Georgia to lift the ban.

Arts and culture

National Register of Historic Places
The county courthouse in Winder was built in 1920, and is listed under the National Register of Historic Places.

Museums
The Barrow County Museum is located in the old Barrow County Jail, built around 1915. It features a hanging tower and jail cells.

Education

Public schools 
Public schools are part of the Barrow County School District and include Winder-Barrow High School. The district consists of eight elementary schools, four middle schools, and two high schools. The district has 610 full-time teachers and over 9,362 students.
The following is a list of schools featured in Winder.
Holsenbeck Elementary School
Kennedy Elementary School
Yargo Elementary School
Bramlett Elementary School
Westside Middle School
Richard B. Russell Middle School
Haymon-Morris Middle School
Winder-Barrow High School
Apalachee High School
Barrow Arts and Sciences Academy (BASA)
Sims Academy of Innovation and Technology

Former Schools
Winder-Barrow Middle School (closed 2013)
Snodon Preparatory School (closed 2014)

Private schools 
Bethlehem Christian Academy
B.C.C.A Barrow County Christian Academy

Colleges and universities 
Lanier Technical College - (Winder-Barrow Campus)

References

External links
 
 City of Winder official website
 Winder, Georgia, at City-Data.com
 Railfanning in Winder, Georgia
 Concord Methodist Cemetery historical marker
 Rockwell Universalist Church historical marker
 Winder's Most Historical Site historical marker

Cities in Georgia (U.S. state)
Cities in Barrow County, Georgia
County seats in Georgia (U.S. state)